Maria Giuseppa Scandola, MSV, (26 January 1849 – 1 September 1903) was an Italian member of the Missionary Sisters of Verona, also known as the Comboni Missionary Sisters. She served in what is now South Sudan, where she offered up her life in 1903.

The cause for Scandola's beatification was opened by the Bishop of Verona in 1977. The cause has since been accepted for investigation by the Holy See, due to which she is referred to as Venerable.

Life
She was born Maria Teresa Scandola in 1849 in Verona, the daughter of Antonio Scandola and Giuseppina Leso. She met Daniel Comboni – later to be declared a saint – in 1871, who  discussed with her his work of evangelization in Central Africa, and his vision of involving women in the mission. Scandola agreed to enter the religious order he envisioned to accomplish this, to be called the Institute of the Pious Mothers of Africa. She was the second woman to join the new foundation. In January of the following year, she entered the novitiate of the new religious order which Comboni had established in Verona, being given the religious habit and her new religious name of Maria Giuseppa. She professed perpetual religious vows on 19 March 1877.

Scandola and four other Comboni Sisters left Verona with Comboni the following 12 December for their mission in Africa, the first European women to serve as missionaries in that region of Africa. She then worked to help children with their education and spiritual development in various towns of Anglo-Egyptian Sudan. On 21 June 1903 she arrived in Lul, located on the banks of the White Nile, for her new mission, where she learned the Shilluk language. She taught the people that "there is no greater love than to lay down one's life for another" and that true love is this: "to know the Father and Jesus Christ who wants everyone to be saved".

Shortly after her arrival there, Scandola offered her own life to God in exchange for that of a young missionary priest, Giuseppe Beduschi, who, thanks to her generosity was then able to continue for many years his apostolic mission in Africa. She died in Lul on 1 September 1903 at the age of 54.

Veneration
The cause for Scandola's beatification commenced in Verona after the Diocese of Malakal, where she had died, transferred the cause to her native Diocese of Verona on 7 October 1997. She received the title of Servant of God after the formal approval of the cause was granted by the Holy See on 23 April 2001. The process in Verona was ratified in 2003 and resulted in the submission of two parts of the positio to the Congregation for the Causes of Saints  in 2009 and 2010, which then began to have the documentation evaluated.

A miracle attributed to Scandola's intercession was presented for investigation and the process was ratified on 17 October 2013. Pope Francis approved the formal decree that her life was one of heroic virtue on 12 June 2014, due to which she is considered Venerable – a step in the process of beatification. A miracle attributed to her is currently under investigation by the Congregation for the Causes of Saints.

References

External links
Hagiography Circle
Saints SQPN

1849 births
1903 deaths
People from Bosco Chiesanuova
19th-century Italian Roman Catholic religious sisters and nuns
Female Roman Catholic missionaries
Italian Roman Catholic missionaries
Venerated Catholics by Pope Francis
19th-century venerated Christians
20th-century venerated Christians
Roman Catholic missionaries in South Sudan
Italian expatriates in South Sudan